Alonso de Fonseca y Acevedo (also Alonso II de Fonseca) (1440 – 12 March 1512) was a Roman Catholic prelate who served as Archbishop of Santiago de Compostela (1460–1465 and 1469–1507), and Archbishop of Seville (1465–1469).

Biography
In 1460, Alonso de Fonseca y Acevedo was appointed by the King of Spain and confirmed by Pope Pius II as Archbishop of Santiago de Compostela. In 1465, he was appointed by Pope Paul II as Archbishop of Seville. On 24 May 1493, he was appointed by Pope Alexander VI as Archbishop of Santiago de Compostela from which he resigned in 1507. 
He was one of the three ambassadors to England that left on 26 August 1501 to accompany princess Catherine of Aragon on her marriage to Arthur, Prince of Wales.
The others were Diego Fernández de Córdoba y Mendoza, 3rd Count of Cabra, and Antonio de Rojas Manrique, bishop of Mallorca.

He died in 1512.

References

External links and additional sources
 (for Chronology of Bishops) 
 (for Chronology of Bishops) 
 (for Chronology of Bishops) 
 (for Chronology of Bishops) 

1512 deaths
16th-century Roman Catholic archbishops in Spain
Bishops appointed by Pope Pius II
Bishops appointed by Pope Paul II
Bishops appointed by Pope Alexander VI
University of Salamanca alumni
1440 births